Darius Blandford (1843–1917) was a blacksmith, sealing captain and political figure in Newfoundland. He represented Bonavista Bay in the Newfoundland and Labrador House of Assembly from 1893 to 1904 as a Conservative.

He was born in Greenspond, the son of Darius Blandford. Port Blandford, was named in his honour.

His brother Samuel was also a sealing captain and served in the Newfoundland assembly.

References 
 

Members of the Newfoundland and Labrador House of Assembly
1843 births
1917 deaths
Newfoundland Colony people